The Abbey (Romanian: Abația) is a science fiction novel by the Romanian author Dan Doboș.  It was first published in 2002 by Editura Nemira.

Plot summary
St. Augustine defined 6 periods from human life.  The last period being the Armageddon - when the armies of humans led by a Messiah will have to defeat the forces of evil.

References

External links
 
  The Abbey  at CititorSF.ro
  The Abbey, online text  - first chapters
  The Abbey at Nemira.ro

Romanian novels
2002 science fiction novels
Romanian science fiction novels
Apocalyptic novels